Donald "Del" Laverdure was the Principal Deputy Assistant Secretary of Indian Affairs at the Department of the Interior and also served as the Acting Assistant Secretary, overseeing the Bureau of Indian Affairs and Bureau of Indian Education.  He is also a former assistant professor of Law & Director of the American Indian Law Program at Michigan State University College of Law.  He has served as Chairman of the Crow Nation Judicial Ethics Board, and Appellate Judge of the Keweenaw Bay Indian Community.

Laverdure has testified before the Parliament of Canada on issues such as self-governance legislation and the Crow Tribal Legislature on water rights, tobacco taxes, and tribal tax legislation. Prior to joining the Michigan State University College of faculty, Laverdure was executive director of the Great Lakes Indian Law Center at the University of Wisconsin Law School.

On April 27, 2012, upon the retirement of Larry Echo Hawk, Laverdure became the Acting Assistant Secretary, where he oversaw the Bureau of Indian Affairs, the Bureau of Indian Education and several other offices. Laverdure served in this role for almost five months until President Barack Obama 's new nominee for Assistant Secretary, Kevin K. Washburn, was confirmed by the U.S. Senate in September 2012, and took office in early October of that year.

One of Laverdure's major accomplishments in his various roles at Interior was shepherding new leasing regulations through the regulatory reform process. Among other improvements, the new leasing regulations provided for pre-emption of state taxation of commercial activities on leased Indian lands and greater deference to tribes in the decision-making process.

References

Crow people
Living people
Michigan State University faculty
Native American academics
United States Bureau of Indian Affairs personnel
University of Arizona alumni
University of Wisconsin Law School alumni
Year of birth missing (living people)